Ivan Valeryevich Melnikov (born 9 January 1997) is a Russian football player who plays as right-back or right midfielder.

Club career
He made his debut in the Russian Professional Football League for FC Torpedo Moscow on 20 July 2015 in a game against FC Energomash Belgorod.

He made his Russian Premier League debut for FC Amkar Perm on 29 October 2017 in a game against FC Ural Yekaterinburg.

Career statistics

Club

References

External links
 Profile by Russian Professional Football League

1997 births
People from Domodedovo (town)
Sportspeople from Moscow Oblast
Living people
Russian footballers
Association football midfielders
Association football defenders
FC Torpedo Moscow players
FC Amkar Perm players
FC Shinnik Yaroslavl players
FC Tyumen players
Russian Premier League players
Russian First League players
Russian Second League players